Ha'il Regional Airport is an airport serving Ha'il (also spelled Hail), the capital of the Ha'il Province in Saudi Arabia.

Facilities

Airlines and destinations

Airlines offering regularly scheduled passenger service:Nesma Airline is no more operating at Hail airport

Note all international flights all offered by non-domestic airlines.

Accidents and incidents
On September 14, 2000, a Qatar Airways Airbus A300 from Doha en route to Amman, Jordan was diverted to Ha'il Airport after being hijacked by an Iraqi asylum seeker. The hijacker immediately surrendered to Saudi authorities upon landing, and the flight continued onward to Amman with no injuries or casualties.

See also 

 Abha International Airport
 King Fahd International Airport
 Jizan Regional Airport

References

External links
 
 
 

Airports in Saudi Arabia
Ha'il Province